Saint-Clément-sur-Guye is a commune in the Saône-et-Loire department in the region of Bourgogne-Franche-Comté in eastern France.

See also
Communes of the Saône-et-Loire department

References

External links

Site of the Society for the Preservation and Enhancement of Saint-Clément-sur-Guye

Communes of Saône-et-Loire